Eckhard I of Scheyern, also Ekkehard von Scheyern ( – died before 11 May 1091), was a son of Otto I, Count of Scheyern. His mother cannot be unambiguously determined because Otto I Scheyern was first married to Haziga of Diessen (the widow of Count Herman of Kastl) and later to an unknown daughter of Count Meginhardt of Reichersbeuern, and the date of Eckhard's birth is not known.

Eckhard I was Vogt of Freising from 1074, and Vogt of Weihenstephan from 1082.

Marriage and children

Eckhard was married to Richardis, a daughter of Ulric I, Margrave of Carniola and Sophia of Hungary.  They had three sons:
 Udalrich I, Count of Scheyern (from 1130 provost of Freising) (de)
 Otto IV, Count of Scheyern, Count Palatine of Bavaria since 1120 (d. 22 Aug 1123) (V of Wittelsbach, IV of Scheyern) 
 Eckhard II of Scheyern (d. c. 1135) (de)

Ancestry

References

Sources

External links 

 Famity tree of the Counts of Scheyern-Wittelsbach-Dachau-Valley
 Entry for Eckhard I at genealogie-mittelalter

House of Wittelsbach
Counts of Germany
11th-century births
1091 deaths
11th-century German nobility